The New England & Western Air Transportation Co. was an airline based in Springfield, Massachusetts that existed for a short period in 1930. It served passengers, but was based on US airmail contract until US government limited who could carry US mail.

See also 
 List of defunct airlines of the United States

External links
History website 

Defunct airlines of the United States
Companies based in Springfield, Massachusetts
Defunct companies based in Massachusetts
Airlines established in 1930
Airlines disestablished in 1930